Konstantinos Drosatos (Greek: Κωνσταντίνος Δροσάτος), born in Athens, Greece, is a Greek-American molecular biologist, who is the Ohio Eminent Scholar and Professor of Pharmacology and Systems Physiology at the University of Cincinnati College of Medicine in Cincinnati, Ohio, U.S. His parents were  Georgios Drosatos and Sofia Drosatou; his family originates in Partheni, Euboea, Greece.

Education and career 
Drosatos received his B.Sc. from the department of biology at the Aristotle University of Thessaloniki, Greece in 2000. In 2000, he continued with graduate studies at the Molecular Biology-Biomedicine graduate program of the department of biology and the medical school of the University of Crete. He received his M.Sc. in 2002 and his Ph.D. in molecular biology-biomedicine in 2007. During his graduate studies (2002–2007) he was a visiting research scholar in the laboratory of Vassilis I. Zannis at Boston University Medical School. Following his graduation with a PhD in molecular biology-biomedicine in 2007, he joined the laboratory of Ira J. Goldberg at Columbia University, where he pursued post-doctoral training until 2012, when he was promoted to associate research scientist in the department of medicine at Columbia University. In 2014 he joined the faculty of the Lewis Katz School of Medicine at Temple University as an assistant professor in pharmacology and in 2020, he was promoted to associate professor with tenure in cardiovascular sciences (primary affiliation). In 2022, he was recruited at the University of Cincinnati College of Medicine, which he joined as the Ohio Eminent Scholar and Professor of Pharmacology and Systems Physiology

Research interests 
The research in his laboratory focuses on cardiovascular and systemic metabolism and particularly on signaling mechanisms that link cardiac stress in diabetes, sepsis and ischemia with altered myocardial fatty acid metabolism. His published work focuses on the transcriptional regulation of proteins that underlie lipoprotein metabolism, cardiac and systemic fatty acid metabolism, and mitochondrial function. His work has identified the role of Krüppel-like factor 5 (KLF5) in the regulation of cardiac fatty acid metabolism in diabetes and ischemic heart failure, as well as how cardiac lipotoxicity leads to cardiac dysfunction, and the importance of cardiac fatty acid oxidation and mitochondrial integrity for the treatment of cardiac dysfunction in sepsis.

Distinctions and awards 
 2014	Outstanding Early Career Award recipient, American Heart Association, BCVS Council 
 2016	Honorary Citizen, Eastern Mani Municipality, Greece 
 2016	Visiting Professor, UCLA Center for Systems Biomedicine 
 2017	Early Research Investigator Award, Lewis Katz School of Medicine at Temple University  
 2017	Elected Fellow (FAHA), American Heart Association  
 2019	Elected Full Member, Sigma Xi, The Scientific Research Honor Society

Leadership positions 
 2006–2010 – founding president of the board of directors, Hellenic Bioscientific Association of the USA
 2012–2014 – president of the executive board, World Hellenic Biomedical Association
 2019–present – vice-president of the executive council, ARISTEiA-Institute for the Advancement of Research & Education in Arts, Sciences & Technology
 2020-2021 - Chair-elect of the Mid-career Committee, International Society for Heart Research-North American Section

References

External links
Publications list

Greek scientists
Greek biologists
American scientists
American biologists
Metabolism
Aristotle University of Thessaloniki alumni
University of Crete alumni
Year of birth missing (living people)
Living people
Scientists from Athens